The Romania women's national under-19 football team is the national under-19 football team of Romania and is governed by the Romanian Football Federation. In the eventuality of a World Cup qualification, the team would function as an under-20 national team.

Since February 2021, Marin Ion was appointed to Romania's women under-19 national team.

UEFA Women's Under-19 Championship

Results at official competitions
Friendly matches are not included.

Top goalscorers in the European Championships
Goalscorers with an equal number of goals are listed in chronological order of reaching the milestone. Bold indicates still active players.
.

References

External links
Official website
FIFA profile

F
Women's national under-19 association football teams